Robert Lavelle Huggar (born April 2, 1977), better known by his initials RL, is an American singer, songwriter and record producer. He is best known for being the lead singer of the R&B group Next.

Early life
Robert Lavelle Huggar was born in 1977 in Minneapolis, Minnesota, to Robert and Toni Huggar. Growing up, he was exposed to a variety of musical styles that helped influence his sound. His admiration of artists like Prince and Michael Jackson and music producers such as Jimmy Jam and Terry Lewis encouraged him to pursue music.

Next

Fronted by Huggar and brothers Terry Brown and Raphael Brown, Next was introduced to producer and DJ artist KayGee from Naughty by Nature. Subsequently, they signed with KayGee's newly formed Divine Mill record label, which, at the time, was distributed through Arista Records.

Solo work
RL first distinguished himself outside of Next with his duet with Deborah Cox on the song "We Can't Be Friends" as well as other feature projects. RL followed up that effort with "The Best Man I Can Be", the super-group track from The Best Man movie soundtrack which also featured Ginuwine, Tyrese and Case. By the time RL's soulful "Good Love" (from The Brothers movie soundtrack) and his hook to Tupac's Until the end of Time were released, he had created an artistic persona distinct and separate from Next. RL: Ements is RL's debut solo project and was released on J Records. It spawned the singles "Got Me a Model" (featuring Erick Sermon) and "Good Man".

Personal life
Huggar has a son, Charles, with his first wife.

In October 2017, he married Lena Danielle. Their daughter Rory Lane was born in January 2018.

Discography

Albums

Singles

As songwriter

Other notable songwriting credits

References

External links
 Official website

20th-century African-American male singers
American contemporary R&B singers
Living people
Musicians from Minneapolis
1977 births
Singers from Minnesota
21st-century American singers
21st-century American male singers
21st-century African-American male singers